The Southern German football championship (German: Süddeutsche Meisterschaft) was the highest association football competition in the southern Germany, established in 1898. The competition was  disbanded in 1933 with the rise of the Nazis to power.

While no senior Southern German championship exists nowadays, the under 15 juniors still play an annual competition for the title, often involving the junior teams of clubs who had once been involved in the senior edition.

Overview
German football was, from its beginnings, divided into regional associations which carried out their own championship, which often pre-dated the national German championship. With the inception of the latter in 1903, the former became qualifying tournaments for it but these regional championships still held a high value for the local clubs. These regional championships were:
 Southern German football championship – formed in 1898
 Brandenburg football championship – formed in 1898
 Central German football championship – formed in 1902
 Western German football championship – formed in 1903
 March football championship – existed from 1903 to 1911
 Northern German football championship – formed in 1906
 South Eastern German football championship – formed in 1906
 Baltic football championship – formed in 1908

All this regional championships were suspended with the rise of the Nazis to power in 1933. At the end of the Second World War, some resumed, now in league format. Others completely disappeared, like the Baltic championship, as the territories they were held in were not part of Germany any more. With the South West German football championship, a new regional competition also appeared in 1945. Ultimately, with the formation of the Bundesliga, all this regional championships ceased altogether.

History

From 1897 to 1919
The Süddeutsche Fußball-Verband (SFV), the Southern German Football Association was formed in Karlsruhe on 17 October 1897, three years before the German Football Association (DFB) was formed. It originally was named Verband Süddeutscher Fußball-Vereine (English: Association of Southern German football clubs). One of the leading figures and driving force in the Southern German football was Walther Bensemann, founder of the kicker sportmagazin, a position he retained until the Nazis rise to power. The other driving force behind football in the south of Germany was Friedrich Wilhelm Nohe, chairman of the Karlsruher FV. The association was formed by eight clubs, those being:
 Karlsruher FV
 Phönix Karlsruhe
 Fidelitas Karlsruhe
 1. FC Pforzheim
 FC Heilbronn
 FG 96 Mannheim
 FC Hanau 93
 Germania 94 Frankfurt

The SFV originally covered a much larger area. Upon its formation in 1897, the following German states and regions were part of it:
 Kingdom of Bavaria
 Kingdom of Württemberg
 Grand Duchy of Baden
 Grand Duchy of Hesse
 Alsace-Lorraine
 Prussian Province of Hohenzollern
 Prussian Province of Hesse-Nassau (southern parts only)
 Prussian Rhine Province (southern parts only)

From 1898, the SFV started to organise an annual Southern German football championship. With the inception of the German football championship in 1903, the Southern German championship functioned as a qualifying tournament for it. Nevertheless, it still enjoyed a high value of status. The competition went through a number of changes throughout its live time. From this season onwards, the competition also grew in size. Previously, only a few selected clubs from cities like Frankfurt, Mannheim and Karlsruhe had taken part, now clubs from Bavaria also entered the competition.

In its early years, competition was very localised and patchy, with a handful of clubs dominating play. From 1907, football became more organised with Southern Germany being split in four local districts (German: Kreis), from 1910 each had their own top-league:
 Nordkreis-Liga, covering Hesse
 Ostkreis-Liga, covering Bavaria
 Südkreis-Liga, covering Württemberg, Baden and Alsace
 Westkreis-Liga, covering the Palatinate, Lorraine and the southern Rhine Province

This step, away from localised competition and towards a more centralised system of leagues with strong competition was a vital factor in the rise of the Southern German clubs to dominance in Germany in the 1920s.

1919 to 1933
After the end of the First World War, the region of Alsace-Lorraine once more became part of France and its clubs did not compete in the SFV-championship any more.

From the 1919–20 season, Southern Germany was sub-divided into ten regional leagues, those being:
 Kreisliga Hessen
 Kreisliga Nordbayern
 Kreisliga Nordmain
 Kreisliga Odenwald
 Kreisliga Pfalz
 Kreisliga Saar
 Kreisliga Südbayern
 Kreisliga Südmain
 Kreisliga Südwest
 Kreisliga Württemberg

The ten league champions then played in two groups of three and one group of four to determine four clubs to enter the semi-finals, the group winners and the second placed team in the group of four qualifying for it. The semi-final winners then entered the Southern German final.

The number of leagues remained the same for the 1922 edition but now league winner and runners-up both qualified for a knock-out round to determine the champion.

In 1923, the league winners again were the only once qualified and the ten teams played a knock-out round first, the remaining five then played a home-and-away tournament for the championship.

After the 1923 season, the German league system was reorganised and streamlined. In the region of the SFV, new Bezirksligas were established as the highest level of play:
 Bezirksliga Bayern
 Bezirksliga Main
 Bezirksliga Rhein
 Bezirksliga Rheinhessen-Saar
 Bezirksliga Württemberg-Baden

For the 1924 championship, this meant, the five league champions and the 1923 champion were qualified to compete in a home-and-away round for the title. Only the champion would then move on to the German championship. In the following season, only the five league winners would compete for the southern title but the best three teams from this competition would then qualify for the German title tournament. For the 1926 edition, the modus remained unchanged apart from the Southern German cup winner also entering the finals tournament.

In 1927, the modus again remained unchanged. However, an additional tournament for the five Bezirksliga runners-up was introduced. The winner of this competition then took up the third Southern German spot in the German Finals, alongside the winner and runners-up of the championship tournament.

After this season, the Bezirksligas were partly reorganised and reduced to four in numbers. However, each Bezirksliga in turn was sub-divided into two regional groups:
 Bezirksliga Bayern, divided into northern and southern Bavaria
 Bezirksliga Main-Hessen, divided into Main and Hessen
 Bezirksliga Rhein-Saar, divided into Rhein and Saar
 Bezirksliga Württemberg-Baden, divided into Württemberg and Baden

From the 1928 season, the best team from each of the eight divisions qualified for southern tournament, still played in a home-and-away modus. Additionally, the second and third placed team from each league went to a consolidation tournament. These sixteen clubs were split into two divisions of eight, regionally subdivided. The two division winners then played an on-off final to determine the third southern team to go to the German finals.

This modus was in place for the 1928, 1929, 1930 and 1931 season.

For its last two seasons, 1932 and 1933, the modus was changed once more for the Southern German championship. The league winners and runners-up now qualified both for the finals tournament, which was played in two groups of eight teams, again regionally sub-divided. The two division winners then played out the Southern championship, with both teams still being qualified for the German finals. The two division runners-up played for the third and last spot at the German finals from the south. The 1932 and 1933 season only differed as far as the regional make up being changed in 1933, away from the system were Württemberg-Baden-Bayern played in one group and Main-Hessen-Rhein-Saar in the other, as it traditionally had been.

The 1932 Southern German final ended in something of a scandal, when the game between Eintracht Frankfurt and the FC Bayern Munich had to be stopped at a 2–0 lead for Eintracht, seven minutes before the end. Bayern supporters had stormed the field and Eintracht Frankfurt was declared the winner. Incidentally, the German final became a rematch which the FC Bayern won 2–0.

1933 to 1945
With the Nazis rise to power in 1933, the Southern German championship was disbanded. The new Nazi Germany did not wish for regional identities to be preserved. Instead of the Bezirksligas, the Gauligas were established:
 Gauliga Bayern
 Gauliga Württemberg
 Gauliga Baden
 Gauliga Südwest/Mainhessen

A Southern championship was not played anymore.

After 1945

Shortly after the end of the Second World War, the Oberliga Süd was established and the South of Germany had a united highest football league for the first time. The region it covered in 1945 originally was:
 Bavaria
 Württemberg
 Hesse
 Baden, northern half only

From 1950, the southern half of the state of Baden also became part of the Oberliga Süd region. The area west of the river Rhine however remained separate from the SFV and formed the Oberliga Südwest.

Up until 1963, the winner of the Oberliga Süd was still referred to as Southern German champions. After 1963, a competition which would have determined a true Southern German champion was not played anymore.

The Oberliga system was disbanded in 1963 in favor of the Bundesliga and the Regionalliga Süd, a tier-two league became the highest regional league. With its disbanding in 1974 in favor of the 2. Bundesliga Süd, the region which was once covered by the Southern German football championship briefly had a united league again, even so it was only on the second tier. This league in turn was disbanded in 1981 for the 2. Bundesliga, which ended the days of a Southern German league.

In 1994, the Regionalliga Süd was re-established, now as a tier-three league, covering the three states of Bavaria, Baden-Württemberg and Hesse. From 2000 to 2008, the south western clubs also formed part of this league once more. From 2008, with the establishment of the 3. Liga, the three southern states are once more the only once covered by this league, now on the fourth tier of the German league system.

Nowadays the Southern German Football Association is made up of the following five federations:

 Bavarian Football Federation (BFV)
 Württemberg Football Federation (WFV)
 (North-) Baden Football Federation (BFV)
 Südbaden Football Federation (SBFV)
 Hesse Football Federation (HFV)

Southern German champions

1899 to 1933: Southern German championship

 The SpVgg Fürth won the German Championship in 1929, qualifying as the third Southern German team.

Winners and runners–up of the Oberliga Süd
The winners and runners–up of the Oberliga Süd:

 Bold Denotes team went on to win German Championship.

Finals
The Southern German championship was not always decided by a one-off final. Before 1908, the championship was carried out with a final. From 1908, the championship was determined through a home-and-away round with the first placed team automatically winning the championship. In the 1916, 1918, 1920, 1921, 1932 and 1933 season, a final was played again.

 1 Game stopped in 83rd minute due to pitch invasion, Eintracht Frankfurt declared the winner.

Cup competition
From 1918 to 1927, the SFV also carried out a cup competition, the Süddeutscher Pokal (English: Southern German Cup), long before a national competition was introduced in Germany in 1935. At times, this cup winner also gained entry to the Southern German championship. The record winner of this competition is the SpVgg Fürth with five titles.

After the Second World War, the Southern German Cup was revitalised in 1952 and functioned as a qualifying tournament for the German Cup. The cup competition was last played in 1974.

Regional champions

1907 to 1919

1920 to 1923

1924 to 1927

1928 to 1933

Source:

 Bold indicates Southern German Champion.

Junior level

Under 19 championship
From 1946, an under 19 championship for Southern Germany existed, having been played annually. A German Under 19 championship was only established in 1969 and shortly after this, in 1973, the Southern German edition was disbanded.

Under 15 championship
In 1979, a Southern German under 15 championship was established, being played annually between the five regional champions. It is now the only level of men's football that still plays out a true Southern championship. The end-of-season tournament is held at a neutral location. Since 2010 the Under 15 Regionalliga Süd is organised in the region, consisting of the best under 15 sides in Southern Germany.

Further reading
 Stürmen für Deutschland: Die Geschichte des deutschen Fussballs von 1933, publisher: Campus Verlag

References

Sources 
 Fussball-Jahrbuch Deutschland  (8 vol.), Tables and results of the German tier-one leagues 1919–33, publisher: DSFS
 kicker Almanach,  The yearbook on German football from Bundesliga to Oberliga, since 1937, published by the kicker Sports Magazine
 Süddeutschlands Fussballgeschichte in Tabellenform 1897–1988  History of Southern German football in tables, publisher & author: Ludolf Hyll

External links 
 [http://www.sfvmuenchen.de/ The Southern German Football Association – Munich]
 The Gauligas Das Deutsche Fussball Archiv 
 German league tables 1892–1933 Hirschi's Fussball seiten'' 
 Germany – Championships 1902–1945 at RSSSF.com
 History of the FC Hanau 93 – Hesses oldest football club 
 History of the SV SW Ludwigshafen  

 
Defunct football competitions in Germany
German football championship
1898 establishments in Germany
1963 disestablishments in Germany
Recurring sporting events established in 1898
Recurring sporting events disestablished in 1963
Defunct football competitions in Bavaria
Football competitions in Baden-Württemberg
Football competitions in Hesse
Football competitions in Rhineland-Palatinate
Football competitions in Alsace-Lorraine